The 2015 Nigerian Senate election in Ogun State held on February 23, 2015, to elect members of the Nigerian Senate to represent Ogun State. Lanre Tejuosho representing Ogun Central and Joseph Dada representing Ogun West won on the platform of the All Progressives Congress while Buruji Kashamu representing Ogun East won on the platform of the Peoples Democratic Party

Overview

Summary

Results

Ogun East 
PDP candidate Buruju Kashamu won the election, defeating APC candidate Dapo Abiodun. Kashamu of PDP won the election defeating APC candidate, Abiodun.

Ogun Central 
APC candidate Lanre Tejuosho won the election, defeating PDP candidate Abisola Sodipo-Clark.

Ogun West
APC candidate Joseph Dada won the election, defeating PDP candidate Waliu Taiwo.

References 

February 2015 events in Nigeria
Ogun State
2015 Ogun State elections